Al Bayati (or Al-Bayati) is a surname. It refers to the Iraqi tribe of the same name.

Notable people 

Abbas al-Bayati, Iraqi Shiite Turkmen politician
Abd al-Wahhab Al-Bayati (1926–1999), Iraqi Arab poet
Basil Al Bayati (1946), Iraqi-born architect
Mohammed Mahdi al-Bayati (1962), Iraqi politician
T. Hamid al Bayati,  Iraqi diplomat, academic and author

Arabic-language surnames